Pennsylvania Route 553 (PA 553) is a  state highway located in Indiana and Cambria counties in Pennsylvania.  The western terminus is at U.S. Route 422 (US 422) in Cherryhill Township.  The eastern terminus is at US 219 in East Carroll Township.

Route description

PA 553 begins at an interchange with access to and from the westbound direction of the US 422 freeway in Cherryhill Township, Indiana County, heading east on a two-lane undivided road. The route heads east-northeast through a mix of farms and woods, curving northeast as it passes through the residential community of Penn Run. The road turns east-northeast into more open agricultural areas with some homes, passing through Manor. PA 553 continues into a mix of farmland and woodland with residences as it comes to an intersection with PA 403. At this point, PA 403 turns east to form a concurrency with PA 553, passing through more rural areas. The road turns southeast and crosses into Pine Township, where PA 403 turns to the southwest and PA 553 turns to the northeast. The route passes through Jewtown and heads through more wooded areas with some fields and homes, curving to the east. The road passes through Mentcle and briefly becomes Mentcle Road before becoming unnamed again. PA 553 heads east-southeast through the residential community of Alverda prior to continuing through more woodland.

PA 553 enters Barr Township in Cambria County and becomes Alverda Road, heading through more wooded areas with some farms and homes. The road curves southeast into open farmland before reaching the residential community of Nicktown, where it intersects PA 271. Here, PA 271 turns east to form a concurrency with PA 553 on Ridge Road, passing through more of the community. The road heads into agricultural areas where PA 271 turns to the north and PA 553 runs to the southeast. The road continues through a mix of farmland and woodland with occasional residences, crossing into West Carroll Township and turning to the east. PA 553 heads through more rural areas, entering East Carroll Township and turning south to reach its eastern terminus at US 219.

Major intersections

See also

References

External links

Pennsylvania Highways: PA 553

553
Transportation in Indiana County, Pennsylvania
Transportation in Cambria County, Pennsylvania